Jacques François Joseph Swebach-Desfontaines (19 March 1769 - 10 December 1823) was a French painter and draughtsman. He was known as "Fontaine" or "Swebach-Desfontaines". He was born in Metz and died in Paris.

18th-century French painters
19th-century French painters
French draughtsmen
Artists from Metz